Recovery auditing is the systematic process of reviewing disbursement transactions and the related supporting data to identify and recover various forms of over payments and under-deductions to suppliers. In other words, it is the recovery of lost money.

History
Recovery auditing was at first primarily for retail based companies. It was developed in the 1970s as a result of companies losing millions of dollars annually because of unpaid invoices, duplicate payments, discounts and allowances not received and general overpayments. Before recovery auditing, this "lost money" was too difficult to identify due to the large amount of transactions processed every year. Companies began investigating deeper into their accounting and found errors in their favor. T

In the United States, two of the largest contributions made by this industry was the Improper Payments Act of 2002 (IPIA) spearheaded by Paul Dinkins and the Medicare Modernization Act of 2003.

Types of Recovery Audit Services
 Accounts Payable
 Contract compliance issues
 Currency mistakes
 Duplicate payments
 Licensing compliance
 Paid credit memos
 Fictitious vendors
 Improperly applied taxes
 Missed cash discounts
 Overpayments
 Pricing errors
 Risk Management
 Shipping errors
 Unclaimed checks

See also
Recovery Audit Contractor

References

External links 
Improper Payments Act of 2002
Medicare Modernization Act of 2003.

Types of auditing